Jane Weiller (April 25, 1912 – June 7, 1989) was an American golfer. She was born and lived in Chicago, Illinois, and was Jewish. 

In 1932, at 20 years of age and playing for Northmoor Country Club, she won the Women's Western Open at the Ozaukee CC in Mequon, Wisconsin, which was retrospectively recognized as a major championship by the LPGA, defeating June Beebe in the final. She competed in college for the Northwestern Wildcats. She later married in 1935 and competed under her married name, Mrs. Lawrence Selz. She also won the Chicago Women's District Golf Association's Championship three times, in 1931, 1944, and 1961. In 1960, she won the women's national amateur championship of Mexico.

Major championships

Wins (1)

References

American female golfers
Amateur golfers
Jewish American sportspeople
Jewish golfers
Winners of LPGA major golf championships
Golfers from Chicago
Northwestern University alumni
1912 births
1989 deaths
20th-century American women
20th-century American people